Richard Woodget (21 November 1845 – 5/6 March 1928) was an English sea captain, best known as the master of the famous sailing clipper Cutty Sark during her most successful period of service in the wool trade between Australia and the United Kingdom.

Richard Woodget was the son of a farmer in Burnham Norton, Norfolk who first went to sea in the coasters plying the waters of the east coast of Britain. In 1868 he received his master's certificate at South Shields. In 1881 Jock Willis made him master of the old ship Coldstream, and in 1885 he was appointed to command Cutty Sark. A well-respected sailor and man manager, Captain Woodget made several record-breaking passages between the United Kingdom and Australia.

In 1895 Cutty Sark was sold to Portuguese interests, and Captain Woodget transferred to command Coldinghame. However he made only one voyage in this ship before retiring from the sea. He bought a farm at Burnham Overy Staithe in his native Norfolk, where he lived until 1926. In 1921 he married Winifred Basham Parker, his second wife. He died on 5/6 March 1928 and was buried in the churchyard of St Margaret's Church, Burnham Norton.

References

Notes

1845 births
1928 deaths
People from King's Lynn and West Norfolk (district)
British sailors
Burials in Norfolk